Funke Oladoye (born 5 December 1993) is a Nigerian sprinter specialising in the 400 metres. She competed in the 4 × 400 metres relay event at the 2015 World Championships in Athletics in Beijing finishing fifth. Her personal best in the 400 metres is 52.55 seconds (Warri 2014).

International competitions

References

External links
 
 
 

1993 births
Living people
Nigerian female sprinters
World Athletics Championships athletes for Nigeria
Athletes (track and field) at the 2014 Commonwealth Games
Athletes (track and field) at the 2015 African Games
People from Ondo City
Commonwealth Games medallists in athletics
Commonwealth Games silver medallists for Nigeria
African Games gold medalists for Nigeria
African Games medalists in athletics (track and field)
21st-century Nigerian women
Medallists at the 2014 Commonwealth Games